Chaani is a 1977 Marathi film directed by Rajaram Vankudre Shantaram. The songs in this film are written by renowned Marathi poet Mr. Chintamani Tryambak Khanolkar under pseudonym Arti Prabhu.

Cast
Ranjana as Channi
Siddharth Ray
Yashvant Dutt

Music
"Ho Kasam Teri Maa Ka" - Manna Dey
"Mai To Jaungi Jaungi Re Us Paar" - Lata Mangeshkar
"Tumhi Ho Mere Apne Yaha" - Lata Mangeshkar
"Do Teen Pahad Pahad" - Usha Mangeshkar

References

External links
 

1977 films
1970s Marathi-language films
Films scored by Hridaynath Mangeshkar